Curry powder is a spice mix originating from the Indian subcontinent where it is typically called garam masala.

History
Key ingredients of curry powder consist of ginger, garlic, fennel, mace, cumin, coriander, cardamom, cinnamon and turmeric and have been in use for over 4000 years, at least since the Indus Valley civilization. As commercially available in Western markets, curry powder is comparable to the traditional Indian concoction of spices known as "garam masala".

Conceived as a ready-made ingredient intended to replicate the flavor of an Indian sauce, it was first sold by Indian merchants to British traders. 

Curry powder was used as an ingredient in 18th century British recipe books, and commercially available from the late 18th century,  with brands such as Crosse & Blackwell and Sharwood's persisting to the present. The ingredient "curry powder", along with instructions on how to produce it, are also seen in 19th Century US and Australian cookbooks, and advertisements. 

British traders introduced the powder to Meiji Japan, in the mid-19th century, where it became known as Japanese curry.

Etymology
In the West, the word "curry" is a broad reference to various Indian curries prepared with different combinations of spices in the Indian subcontinent. The sauce like component characterized with "curry" has been derived from the Tamil word kaṟi meaning 'sauce' or 'relish for rice', and finds synonyms with other regional references to local dishes evolving over thousands of years in the Indian subcontinent, such as "jhol", "shorba" and "kalia".

Ingredients 
A number of standards on curry powder have been defined. Most outline analytical requirements such as moisture, ash content, and oil content as well as permissible additives. Some also define a number of expected ingredients.

In the United States, curry powder is expected to contain at least these ingredients: turmeric, coriander, fenugreek, cinnamon, cumin, black pepper, ginger, and cardamom.

The 1999 East Asian standard (EAS 98:1999) does not define an ingredient baseline. A newer 2017 draft from Uganda does require turmeric, coriander, cumin, fenugreek and mustard.

The Indian (FSSAI), Pakistani (PS:1741-1997), and international (ISO 2253:1999) standards do not define a baseline of essential ingredients.

Nutritional information

One tablespoon (6.3 g) of typical curry powder contains the following nutrients according to the USDA:
 Food energy: 
 Fat: 0.883 g
 Carbohydrates: 3.52 g
 Fibers: 3.35 g
 Protein: 0.9 g

References

Anglo-Indian cuisine
Herb and spice mixtures
Indian cuisine in the United Kingdom
Powders